Aktarla can refer to:

 Aktarla, Düzce
 Aktarla, Merzifon